Tanović is a surname. Notable people with the surname include:

Danis Tanović (born 1969), Bosnian film director and screenwriter
Lejla Tanović (born 1994), Bosnian mountain bike racing and road cyclist
Tajna Tanović, German singer-songwriter, actress and photographer

Bosnian surnames